John Edmund Ryan  (13 March 1923 – 9 February 1987) was an Australian diplomat and public servant.

Early life, education and military service
Ryan was born in Bondi, Sydney in 1923. He was educated in Canberra at St Christopher's School, and later attended St Patrick's College, Goulburn on a bursary. He enrolled at the University of Sydney in 1941, but only completed the first year of an arts degree before enlisting in the Second Australian Imperial Force on 9 January 1942. He served as a corporal with the 2/7th Independent Company in New Guinea until March 1943 when he was selected for officer training at the Royal Military College, Duntroon. Due to the war, he completed a shortened version of the training, during which he was injured in a transport accident.

Diplomatic career
Ryan was discharged from the AIF in 1946, and later that year, joined the Department of External Affairs. He served as High Commissioner to Ghana (1965–67) and Ambassador to Laos (1968–69), then Ambassador to Italy (1974–77) and High Commissioner to Canada (1977–80).

Public service
In 1980, Ryan returned to Canberra and became deputy secretary of the Department of Foreign Affairs. In October 1981, he was appointed acting Director-General of the Australian Secret Intelligence Service. In late 1983, a bungled ASIS training exercise known as the Sheraton Hotel incident occurred, in which armed ASIS officers conducted a mock hostage rescue in a Melbourne hotel without the knowledge or permission of the hotel management or Victoria Police. Ryan resigned from ASIS in December 1983, and the incident was reviewed by the second Hope Royal Commission, which criticised Ryan and his role in the operation. He retired from the public service in May 1984.

Ryan died of lymphoma on 9 February 1987 in Canberra.

References

1923 births
1987 deaths
Australian Officers of the Order of the British Empire
Australian Army officers
Australian Army personnel of World War II
Ambassadors of Australia to Brazil
Ambassadors of Australia to Italy
Ambassadors of Australia to Laos
Directors-General of the Australian Secret Intelligence Service
High Commissioners of Australia to Canada
High Commissioners of Australia to Ghana
Royal Military College, Duntroon graduates
University of Melbourne alumni
Deaths from lymphoma
Deaths from cancer in the Australian Capital Territory